The following is a list of real or historical people who have been portrayed as President of the United States in fiction, although they did not hold the office in real life. This is done either as an alternate history scenario, or occasionally for humorous purposes. Also included are actual U.S. presidents with a fictional presidency at a different time and/or under different circumstances than the one in actual history.

H

Alexander Hamilton
 In the short story Hamilton vs. Napoleon by Elizabeth Bennet, Alexander Hamilton in June 1804 announced that he would not fight a duel with Aaron Burr, writing "I am not a young, wild bachelor free to throw away his life on a whim. As a family man, and my family already having experienced the loss of a beloved son thorough the madness of a duel, I have no right to risk depriving this family of mine of a husband and a father". American public opinion in general approved of Hamilton's position. His enmity with Burr became, however, ever more intensive, the two heading for a decisive political duel rather than one with guns. Towards the 1808 Presidential Election, Hamilton and Burr alike worked with relentless energy, which swept off the field other plausible candidates such as James Madison. Hamilton gathered the remnants of the declining Federalist Party together with some defectors from the rival Democratic-Republican Party and various disaffected local factions in different states – altogether creating a strong new party and sweeping to power in 1808. The defeated Burr, bitter and frustrated, left the US ahead of his rival's inauguration, wandered the world and took up some wild schemes and adventures. Burr ended up at the court of Emperor Napoleon I in Paris, trying in vain to convince the Emperor to launch an invasion of the United States and eventually accepting a commission as a colonel in the French Army. For his part, President Hamilton embarked on such pet projects as strengthening the Bank of the United States, but his attention was soon drawn to foreign affairs. Alarmed by the expiration of the Jay Treaty and the danger of war with Britain, which in Hamilton's view would have been disastrous, Hamilton oversaw intensive new negotiations with London. This culminated with the British undertaking not to impress any more American sailors into the Royal Navy, in exchange for the US joining the war against France and sending a squadron of ten warships to fight in European waters. The treaty also gave the US considerable advantages in trade with British colonies. For the British, this new alliance meant no need to spend resources on preparing for a war in North America. Relying on the good will of Hamilton's United States, British garrisons in Canada were pared down to a minimum, large units being sent across the Atlantic to reinforce Wellington in the Peninsular War – where Hamilton also sent 3,000 volunteer American troops, later increased to 5,000. The reinforced Wellington was able to make much quicker progress than he would otherwise, already in mid-1813 breaching the Pyrenees and invading Southern France. This faced the embattled Napoleon, already smarting from his disastrous invasion of Russia, with the dilemma whether to go on trying to maintain French hold over the German states or rush home to deal with the invasion of French soil. Napoleon dithered – which proved disastrous for him. The Battle of the Nations at Leipzig ended with a complete rout of the French Army, many soldiers and officers fleeing in a disorderly mass and seeking to get back to France. In the confusion, the Emperor Napoleon was killed at a farm on the outskirts of Leipzig, among several bodies found lying near him also that of the exile American Aaron Burr. The riddle of what happened there would exercise historians, novelists and conspiracy theorists for generations to come. At news of the Emperor's death, the Bonaparte regime collapsed and the Allies marched unopposed into Paris and restored the Bourbon monarchy with Louis XVIII as the new king. President Hamilton – now on his second term – attended the Congress of Vienna, his conservative brand of Republicanism favorably impressing the gathered European diplomats and Heads of State. Hamilton succeeded in making one significant contribution to the post-Napoleonic European Order, securing a restoration of the ancient Venetian Republic, though under Austrian tutelage, rather than Venice being annexed outright. The grateful Venetians erected a giant statue of Hamilton in the Piazza San Marco. On his way back, the President was held up by storms and floods, spending three days at the inn of a Flemish village – where he had a poignant brief affair with a peasant girl less than half his age. Knowing he would never see her again – and that it was better that way – Hamilton wrote in his diary: "The world will never know the name of Waterloo, but for me it will always be the place where I had known the sweetest surrender of my life". Hamilton was criticized in Congress for entangling the US in European affairs and for being absent from the country for an extended period. In response, the President could point to the US being awarded, for its part in defeating Napoleon, the two Caribbean islands of Guadeloupe and Martinique. This, however, proved a mixed blessing at best. In coming decades the two islands proved endlessly tiresome to successive American governors, plagued by unrest, rioting and major slave rebellions and being the scene of heavy fighting in the American Civil War – until finally taken into the Union as the State of Carribea.
 In the short story "Paine's Pain" by Margaret Klein, Alexander Hamilton is elected president in an emergency election called by the Electoral College after Tom Paine is assassinated in November 1792. Hamilton would swiftly proceed to annul Paine's reforms and was re-elected President in 1793.

Hannibal Hamlin
 In the alternate history short story "Must and Shall" by Harry Turtledove, Hannibal Hamlin becomes the 17th President after his predecessor Abraham Lincoln was killed by a Confederate army sharpshooter at the Battle of Fort Stevens on July 12, 1864, while observing General Jubal Early's attack. Hamlin, who had retired to Bangor, Maine after being passed over for renomination as Vice President in favor of Andrew Johnson, received an emergency telegram to summoned him out of Bangor to Washington, D.C. to assume the Presidency shortly after Lincoln's death. Nine days later on July 21, Hamlin becomes the 17th President and at his inaugural speech, he promises severe retribution on the Confederate States after the Great Rebellion ends, even using Lincoln's death as justification for the oppressive peace. This involved the hanging of Jefferson Davis, Robert E. Lee, Joseph E. Johnston, and other Confederate leaders for high treason, a harsh occupation of the rebellious states, the destruction of their economy and further racial division due to the promotion of blacks to important offices, leading to great animosity between the inhabitants of the North and South. The complete military control of the former Confederacy by the U.S., and the continued rebelliousness of white Southerners, continued until at least 1942 - at which time Nazi Germany smuggled weapons into the South to stir up revolt and distract the U.S. government.
 In If the South Had Won the Civil War by MacKinlay Kantor, Hannibal Hamlin became president in 1863, after the Confederates achieved a decisive  victory and Robert E. Lee's troops occupied Washington, D.C. Abraham Lincoln, held prisoner in Richmond, sent northwards a letter announcing his resignation, making Hamlin the new President. It fell to President Hamlin to complete the bitter work of negotiating the border with the newly independent CSA. The most bitter pill he had to swallow was to concede the permanent loss of Washington and its transformation into the Confederate capital – made inevitable by Maryland joining the Confederacy (as did Kentucky). Hamlin's main achievement was the retention of West Virginia in the Union, as well as preventing pro-Confederate militias in Missouri from detaching that State. In the debate over the location of the new US Capital, Hamlin strongly opposed the proposal of making Philadelphia the capital – which would have alienated all the states west of the Alleghenies – and supported the finally accepted compromise of Columbus, Ohio, which is renamed "Columbia". As he did not stand for re-election in 1864, Hamlin did not actually get to take residence in the new capital at Columbus, which was only made ready years later.
In Underground Airlines by Ben H. Winters, the assassination of President-elect Abraham Lincoln led to the adoption of a modified version of the Crittenden Compromise, with slavery being preserved into the twenty-first century in the 'Hard Four' states: Alabama, Louisiana, Mississippi and a unified Carolina. Presumably, Hannibal Hamlin as Vice-President-elect would have been sworn in as President as a result of Lincoln's assassination.

Winfield Scott Hancock
 In the alternate history story "Patriot's Dream" by Tappan King contained in the anthology Alternate Presidents edited by Mike Resnick, Winfield Scott Hancock was Samuel J. Tilden's running mate in 1876, defeating Rutherford B. Hayes. Consequently, Tilden became the 19th President with Hancock as his vice president. Although they were elected as Democrats, they later founded the reformist Liberal Party. After serving two terms as vice president, Hancock was elected as the 20th president in 1884 and went on to be re-elected in 1888. His vice president was Grover Cleveland, who won the Liberal Party's presidential nomination in 1892 and was widely expected to defeat his Democratic opponent James G. Blaine. Cleveland's running mate was Susan B. Anthony.

Warren G. Harding
 In the short story "A Fireside Chat" by Jack Nimersheim contained in the anthology Alternate Presidents edited by Mike Resnick, Warren G. Harding died of a stroke during the 1920 election campaign. The election was eventually won by the Democratic candidate James M. Cox with Franklin D. Roosevelt as his running mate. Five weeks after the election, however, President-elect Cox was assassinated by an anti-League of Nations activist, meaning that Roosevelt took office as the 29th President on March 4, 1921. Shortly after the Nazi Party rose to power as a result of the Bürgerbräu Putsch in 1922, President Roosevelt and the Chancellor of Germany, Adolf Hitler, established an alliance in order to maintain the balance of power.

W. Averell Harriman
 President Harriman, mentioned in The Number of the Beast by Robert A. Heinlein, is presumably W. Averell Harriman. In reading an almanac from our universe, it is noted that Dwight D. Eisenhower served one of his terms in office (meaning he either served from 1949–1957 or 1957–1965).

Benjamin Harrison
 In the short story "Love Our Lockwood" by Janet Kagan contained in the anthology Alternate Presidents edited by Mike Resnick, Benjamin Harrison lost the 1888 election to Belva Ann Lockwood, who became the 23rd President as well as the first woman to hold the office. He was once again the Republican presidential candidate in 1892 and was defeated on that occasion by Grover Cleveland, who became the 24th President, having previously served as the 22nd President from 1885 to 1889.
 In the alternate history series Southern Victory novel How Few Remain by Harry Turtledove, Benjamin Harrison served as the Secretary of War in the cabinet of Republican President James G. Blaine from 1881 to 1885. He oversaw the US military during the Second Mexican War (1881–1882) and consequently shouldered much of the blame for the United States' defeat by the Confederate States of America, the United Kingdom and France. As a result, the Republicans became an ineffectual centrist third party, with their right wing defecting to the Democrats and their left wing establishing the Socialist Party, and the Republicans never again winning the presidency. He was the grandson of William Henry Harrison, who had served as the 9th President of the United States from March 4 to April 4, 1841, as a member of the Whig Party.

William Henry Harrison
 William Henry Harrison, the actual 9th President of the United States, had an alternate presidency in Tom Wicker's "His Accidency". The Point of Departure is Harrison's apparently trivial decision to wear a hat and a coat to his inauguration on March 4, 1841, and cut in half the inauguration speech he prepared, delivered in the open on a cold and rainy day. Thereby, Harrison avoided the pneumonia which in actual history killed him a month later, and served out his full term. Thus, Vice President John Tyler never ascended to the presidency. In actual history Tyler – a Virginian – had actively promoted Texas, a slave state, joining the Union; conversely, in Wicker's alternate history the surviving Harrison, a Northerner, was lukewarm to the idea. As a result, the Texans accepted the offer of Mexico to recognize Texas provided that it remained independent and did not join the US. Texas indeed remained the Lone Star Republic and did not join the US. The Mexican War did not break out and thus California, Arizona, and New Mexico remained part of Mexico. Harrison's care for his personal health turned out to have seriously derailed the Manifest Destiny.

Gary Hart
 Gary Hart is the president from 1981 to 1989 in an alternate world inhabited by Susannah Dean, Eddie Dean, and Jake Chambers at the end of Stephen King's novel The Dark Tower VII: The Dark Tower. Eddie mentions that Hart was elected in a landslide in the 1980 election after almost dropping out due to the "Monkey Business business." In real life, Hart ran for president in 1984 and 1988 (not 1980 and 1984), and the Monkey Business scandal happened in 1987 (not 1980). In this alternate timeline, Ronald Reagan never entered politics.
 In the alternate history science fiction series For All Mankind, Gary Hart is the president from 1985 to 1993, succeeding Ronald Reagan. It is mentioned through newsreel footage that Hart won re-election in 1988 by defeating the Republican nominee, Pat Robertson, in a landslide.

Rutherford B. Hayes
 In the alternate history short story "Patriot's Dream" by Tappan Wright King contained in the anthology Alternate Presidents edited by Mike Resnick, Rutherford Hayes lost the 1876 Presidential Election to Democratic candidate Samuel J. Tilden.
 In the alternate history novel The Guns of the South by Harry Turtledove, Rutherford Hayes was one of the commanders of the United States Army in the Eastern Theater during the Second American Revolution. His brigade of Ohioans was part of the Union army of between six and seven thousand men under the command of General George Crook. On May 9, 1864, Crook's army attacked Confederate forces under General Albert Gallatin Jenkins just south of Cloyd's Mountain, Virginia. Though the Unions greatly outnumbered their opponents, the Confederates were armed with type of "repeating" rifle, called the AK-47. With these guns, the Confederate troops were able to hold their position, and the Union troops were forced to retreat to the north. Hayes ended up getting killed during the battle.

Ernest Hemingway
 Ernest Hemingway was president between 1956 and 1964 in Harry G. Kaufman's story "Boozing in the Oval Room". He entered the 1956 election as an independent, after the deaths of both Dwight D. Eisenhower and Adlai Stevenson (from illness and a road accident respectively). President Hemingway invited Fidel Castro to The White House in 1959 and forged a close alliance with Castro's Cuba. In 1962, Hemingway engaged in a scandalous fist fight inside the White House with the much younger John F. Kennedy, here Mayor of Boston, over the favors of Marilyn Monroe.

Charlton Heston
 In the alternate history Dark Future novel series by Kim Newman, Charlton "Big Chuck" Heston succeeded Spiro Agnew as president. He was himself succeeded by Oliver North.
 In a parallel universe featured in the Lois & Clark: The New Adventures of Superman Season Two episode "Tempus, Anyone?", Charlton Heston was the incumbent president in 1996.

Paris Hilton
 Paris Hilton was portrayed as president in an alternate universe on The Suite Life of Zack & Cody episode The Suite Smell of Excess. She makes it illegal to weigh more than 108 pounds. Hilton herself once joked in a famous YouTube video that she would run for president in the 2008 election, after John McCain used footage of her to negatively portray Barack Obama as a mere celebrity.

Ernest Hollings
 Ernest Hollings is president in an alternate reality briefly visited by Father Callahan in Stephen King's novel The Dark Tower V: Wolves of the Calla. Although the real Hollings sought the candidacy in the 1984 election, in Wolves of the Calla he was elected in 1980.

Henry Hohenzollern (Prince Henry of Prussia)
 It is a fact of our history that in 1786 there was a proposal to invite Prince Henry of Prussia, brother of Frederick the Great, to be either the President of the Monarch of the United States – but the proposal was retracted even before the Prince could answer. Later, the US Constitution specifically stipulated that the President must be a person born in US territory, thus foreclosing the option of Prince Henry or any other European royal assuming the Presidency. However, in the alternate history timeline of Susan Howard's story "The Republican King of America", an outbreak of social unrest and violent riots in Philadelphia and other American cities during the Constitutional Convention made the more conservative circles alarmed about "The dangers of Rampant Democracy". The idea of an American Monarchy gathered momentum, with the final text of the Constitution leaving open the option of a foreign-born President. Following the 1789 election, Prince Henry's candidacy was formally put forward. The Electoral College was split down the middle and after four months of tense deadlock, Prince Henry was elected President by a narrow majority. George Washington was elected Vice President, but refused to take the Oath of Office and withdrew to Mount Vernon in a huff. In 1790 the newborn United States seemed on the verge of civil war, with daily violent clashes between supporters and opponents of the President, rival militias openly training and calls made on Washington to embark on rebellion and "end the new Royal Tyranny, as he did the old". The President considered the options of imposing martial law or alternately resigning and going back to Germany, when he got a surprising invitation to visit the dying Benjamin Franklin, who had strongly opposed his election. The President accepted and spent a whole day in intensive conversation with Franklin. Three days later, in New York, he made a speech – drafted by Franklin, but delivered with conviction by the President who had gained fluency in English at a remarkable speed: "My Fellow Citizens, I am a Prince born and bred, the brother of a King – but I have crossed a great ocean and came to another land, where the laws and customs are different. You, my fellow citizens, have fought long and bravely to create a Republic, and a Republic it will remain, this my adopted homeland. I will seek no greater Power or Honor than being President of the United States, which is Power enough and Honor more than enough. I will wear no flowing Royal robes, nothing but the sober clothes which any prosperous merchant might have. I will live in no sumptuous palace but in a comfortable house sufficient for my needs. President of a Republic I am, and that I am proud to remain". At the same time, he also dropped the aristocratic "von" from his name, becoming plain President Henry Hohenzollern, and formally renounced all his European titles and possessions. The President's speech reverberated throughout the country (as well as shocking the Royal families of Europe, and especially his relatives in Berlin). George Washington consented to take up the position of Vice President and work together with the President, and they eventually came to be personal friends. The threat of civil war receded, and Americans started to realize that they had a capable, conscientious President who gave keen attention to the country's problems and was far from haughty or overbearing. However, radical groups continued to distrust the President and suspect him of biding his time and still planning to make himself a King. In June 1791, while visiting a farm in Massachusetts, the President was surprised by an assassin. The first shot missed him and hit a sixteen year old farm worker, who was wounded and lay bleeding and screaming on the ground. Thereupon the President – a veteran soldier – flung himself upon the boy, to protect him with his own body. The President was then killed by the assassin's second and third shots. His funeral was well attended, even his most staunch political foes sharing in the national grief and listening to the moving funeral oration delivered by Washington. Congress refused the request of the Prussian Royal Family to let his body be buried with other deceased Hohenzollerns, writing: "Our President he was and in our land he died most nobly. In our soil he will rest and in our hearts he will live on". Congress also resolved to erect in the new national Capital by the Potomac a tall column bearing a statue of President Hohenzollern, "So that his example will serve to inspire the Presidents who follow". The Constitution was not changed, leaving open the option of foreign-born Presidents – though there was no further attempt to introduce scions of European Royalty. As a result, in 1972 Henry Kissinger was Richard Nixon's running mate and following the Watergate scandal became president in 1974. In the frame story President Kissinger sits in the oval office after his inauguration, gazes at the Hohenzollern Column which is still prominent on the Capital's skyline, and muses that "But for Alexander Hamilton's Monarchial dreams, I would not have been here".

Herbert Hoover
 In the short story "Truth, Justice, and the American Way" by Lawrence Watt-Evans contained in Alternate Presidents edited by Mike Resnick, Herbert Hoover defeated his Democratic opponent Franklin D. Roosevelt in the 1932 election as a result of Al Smith, the Democratic nominee in 1928, running as a third party candidate and splitting the Democratic party. On the advice of his Secretary of State Henry L. Stimson, Hoover went to war with Japan in 1934. After defeating Roosevelt in 1936, Stimson became the 32nd President and, under his leadership, the United States emerged victorious from the war. However, President Stimson was criticized for not crushing Japan entirely by invading the Home Islands. In 1948, Adolf Hitler was overthrown and killed by a cabal of generals and Hermann Göring succeeded him as the second Führer, continuing to serve in that position until at least 1953. Due to the survival of Nazi Germany, totalitarianism and antisemitism grew stronger across the world well into the 1950s.
 In Harry Turtledove's Southern Victory alternate history series (American Empire: The Center Cannot Hold and American Empire: The Victorious Opposition), Herbert Hoover was initially elected vice president in 1932 on the Democratic ticket with Calvin Coolidge. Despite the prosperity of the country under Socialist President Upton Sinclair after the Great War (1914–1917), the fortunes of the country had fallen dramatically under Sinclair's successor, Hosea Blackford. The strong stock market which had characterized most of the 1920s had finally crashed in 1929. President Blackford was unable to deal satisfactorily with the resulting depression. In 1932, the United States found itself in the Pacific War against the Empire of Japan. While the war was largely a stalemate on the ocean, Japan ran a successful air-raid on the city of Los Angeles on the very day that Blackford was in-town for a rally. Thus, when Hoover was nominated to be Coolidge's running mate, the Democrats were in the strongest position they had been in for over a decade. Coolidge defeated Blackford handily. However, Coolidge died on January 5, 1933, of a heart attack, less than a month before he was to take office on February 1, and so Vice President-elect Hoover became the 31st president in his stead. Although Hoover was a Democrat, his Secretary of War was Franklin D. Roosevelt, a lifelong Socialist politician in spite of being a relative of staunch Democrat Theodore Roosevelt. Despite some of the initial optimism expressed by the voters, Hoover quickly proved a disappointment. His complete contempt for "paternalism" in the federal government rendered him just as ill-equipped to handle the economic depression as Blackford had been. He made this opinion known when Colonel Abner Dowling, the then-military governor of Utah, proposed a make-work plan for the state. Hoover flatly refused, despite the fact that the jobless rate in Utah was further exacerbating that already-precarious situation. This stance led the voters to return the Socialists to Congress in 1934. Hoover's handling of foreign affairs also frustrated many of his supporters in the military. While he continued the policy of rearmament begun by Blackford, the Pacific War ended inconclusively in 1934. After Jake Featherston and the Freedom Party came to power in the Confederate States of America, Hoover proved indecisive in his dealings with the United States' long-time enemy. When Featherston pressed for permission to arm more troops to suppress black uprisings, Hoover (after a period of vacillation) acquiesced, justifying his decision by citing his concerns about "radical" elements among the black Confederate community, and naively concluding that Featherston would not use the increased military against the United States. While Hoover did stand strong against Featherston on the rebellious states of Kentucky and Houston which the United States had taken from the Confederate States following the Great War, it was too little, too late. Growing dissatisfaction with Hoover led to his defeat in 1936 at the hands of Socialist Al Smith and his running mate Charles W. La Follette, who became the 32nd President. One of Hoover's last official duties included acting as pallbearer at his predecessor Hosea Blackford's state funeral, as did former President Sinclair.
 In the alternate history short story "Joe Steele" by Harry Turtledove, Hoover's failure to end the United States' downward spiral into the Great Depression during his term led to his defeat in the 1932 election at the hands of Congressman Joe Steele of California, who became the 32nd President. Hoover won only 59 electoral votes from Connecticut, Delaware, Maine, New Hampshire, Pennsylvania and Vermont and would become the last Republican elected to the presidency, as President Steele slowly but surely built up the powers of his office until he was effectively the dictator of the United States. Steele was ultimately elected to six terms from 1932 to 1952, dying only six weeks into his sixth term on March 5, 1953. He was succeeded by his vice president John Nance Garner, who became the 33rd President at the age of 84. However, he was overthrown and executed almost immediately by J. Edgar Hoover, who proved to be even more tyrannical than Steele.
 In the 2015 alternate history novel "Joe Steele", which is an expansion of the short-story of the same name, Hoover's role in the novel is slightly larger than in the short story. It is mentioned that the fundamental difference between him and Steele could be seen in Steele's inauguration on March 4, 1933. President Hoover and his wife, Lou, wore refined (if dated) clothing that suggested their "importance" to the audience. Steele and his wife, Betty, each dressed tastefully, but in clothing the average person might be able to afford. During the 1936 presidential election, former president Hoover sought the Republican nomination, but he lost to Alf Landon, who in turn would loose the election in a landslide to Steele.

J. Edgar Hoover
 Portrayed as president in the Red Dwarf episode "Tikka to Ride". When the Red Dwarf crew inadvertently prevented the Assassination of John F. Kennedy, he was impeached in a sex scandal (with a mistress shared with Mafia boss Sam Giancana) in 1964. J. Edgar Hoover was forced to run for president by the Mafia, who blackmailed him with evidence that he was a cross-dresser. In return for unrestricted Mafia cocaine trafficking, Hoover allowed the Soviet Union to set up a nuclear base in Cuba, resulting in widespread panic, the abandonment of major American cities, the increasing likelihood of nuclear conflict and, in all likelihood, a Soviet victory in the Space Race due to a demoralized America. Hoover's presidency was erased when Kennedy commits suicide in Dallas in 1963 (by shooting his past self on the grassy knoll as the car passes through), restoring the timeline (with the future Kennedy fading out of existence due to him killing his past self).
 In the Sliders Second Two episode "Time Again and World", the group arrives in a parallel universe in which the United States exists in a state of martial law. After the assassination of John F. Kennedy by Julius and Ethel Rosenberg in 1963, J. Edgar Hoover succeeded him as the 36th President, serving for 22 years until his death in 1985, implemented martial law and amended the Constitution, excising most of the Bill of Rights. In tribute to Hoover, all police officers wear skirts instead of pants. In that alternate dimension, the prison on Alcatraz Island is a fully functioning penitentiary where the most dangerous political prisoners are kept, including civil rights activists Martin Luther King Jr. and Robert F. Kennedy as well as loud, out-spoken comedian Sam Kinison.
 Hoover also was president in one of many alternate realities mentioned in Richard Bowes' From the Files of the Time Rangers. He is briefly mentioned as being President in the 1940s; how he became president or what happens to him is not revealed in the novel.
 Another dictatorial J. Edgar Hoover, in Harry Turtledove's alternate history short story "Joe Steele", got to power earlier, in 1953 – having won a bloody power struggle between new president John Nance Garner and Vince "The Hammer" Scriabin (Vyacheslav Molotov) following the death of President Joe Steele in March 1953 – an avatar of none other than Joseph Stalin, whose parents in this timeline emigrated to the US making him an American citizen (and eventually an American dictator). Hoover was the head of Steele's secret police, putting him in good position to become the next dictator-president, and proving even more brutal than Steele-Stalin.
 In the 2015 alternate history novel "Joe Steele", also by Turtledove, which is an expansion of the short-story of the same name, Hoover's role is the same as it is in the short-story up until Steele's death. When Steele died in March 1953, Vice President John Nance Garner ascended to the presidency. While he quickly exiled Lazar Kagan and Stas Mikoian, Vince Scriabin refused to go. Garner also secured the resignation of the entire cabinet, save for Secretary of State Dean Acheson and Secretary of War George Marshall. Scriabin tapped into the remaining clout he had in the Senate. Subsequently, Acheson died in a plane crash. A week later Marshall was about to give a speech, when he was poisoned, turned blue and keeled over. Despite there being several doctors on hand, Marshall died from the poisoning. Garner figured out quickly that someone was moving against him, which he confided in Charlie Sullivan, who'd joined the administration as a speechwriter in 1939. Sullivan accused Scriabin, but also reminded Garner that J. Edgar Hoover was also another likely enemy. He suggested that Garner replace his guard detail, almost exclusively GBI agents, with soldiers. No sooner had Garner resolved to do all this than he was informed that the House had introduced legislation to impeach Garner for high crimes and misdemeanors, and suspected Scriabin's hand at work again. Garner took steps to try to slow down the impeachment process. He issued an executive order eliminating the restricted zone for former wreckers, an act criticized by Hoover. Moreover, the leaders of the impeachment drive were unmoved. The death of Scriabin, who was hit by a car, also did little to halt the impeachment. In the end the House passed three articles of impeachment, and the case went to the Senate, which voted overwhelmingly for conviction. The following day, J. Edgar Hoover, claiming that Congress was attempting to arrogate the powers of the executive to themselves, took temporary executive authority as Director of the United States. He ordered the citizens to follow the local authorities, outlawed assemblies of ten people or more, and arrested Congressional leaders "responsible" for the current state of affairs. He also cleared out the remaining government employees who'd served under Steele and Garner, including Charlie Sullivan. A few months later, a bomb exploded inside GBI headquarters, killing 26 people. Hoover had left just half an hour before. The GBI claimed a relative of a Representative who'd voted against impeaching Garner was responsible, and in response, Hoover clamped down further on Congress.

John Hospers
 In the alternate history novel The Probability Broach by L. Neil Smith in which the United States became a libertarian state after a successful Whiskey Rebellion and the overthrowing and execution of George Washington by firing squad for treason in 1794, John Hospers served as the 25th President of the North American Confederacy from 1972 to 1984.

Cordell Hull
 In the alternate history novel Worldwar: Striking the Balance by Harry Turtledove, Cordell Hull served as the Secretary of State from 1933 to 1944 under President Franklin D. Roosevelt. He held this office during World War II (1939 to 1942) as well as after the Race's Conquest Fleet invaded Earth on June 5, 1942. Given that Vice President Henry A. Wallace was killed when the Raced dropped an atomic bomb in Seattle in 1944, Hull became second in the line of succession to the presidency. When Roosevelt died later that year, Hull became the 33rd President of the United States. At 72, he was the oldest man to ever serve as president. He selected General George Marshall to replace him as Secretary of State. As the Race presence on American soil had made Congressional elections impossible to that point, President Hull was resigned to the possibility that he might continue on as president rather than stand for election in November. The Peace of Cairo did bring the war to an end before the scheduled election. The Race were disappointed that Roosevelt's death and Hull's ascension did not lead to the collapse of the United States.

Hubert Humphrey
 In a parallel universe, designated Earth-712 featured in the comic book The Avengers No. 147 (May 1976), Hubert Humphrey served as president. His immediate successor was Nelson Rockefeller, who was the incumbent president in 1976. In this universe, Richard Nixon never had a political career.
 In the alternate history novel 11/22/63 by Stephen King, Hubert Humphrey defeated the incumbent President Curtis LeMay in 1972. He was himself defeated by Ronald Reagan in 1976.

I

Lee Iacocca
 The movie World Gone Wild (1988) is set in 2087 where civilization collapsed after a nuclear war. In one scene of the movie, a character is looking at pre-war relics and finds a copy of Iacocca's autobiography. He mentions that Iacocca had been a great President.

J

Andrew Jackson
 In the short story "Black Earth and Destiny" by Thomas Easton contained in the anthology Alternate Presidents edited by Mike Resnick, Andrew Jackson was elected as the 6th president in 1824, defeating John Quincy Adams. His vice president was John C. Calhoun. As a result, biological and chemical engineering were developed earlier.
 In the short story "Chickasaw Slave" by Judith Moffett, also contained in the anthology Alternate Presidents edited by Mike Resnick, Andrew Jackson's image is tarnished as a result of a land-dealing scandal. This causes him to lose the 1828 election to Davy Crockett, who becomes the 7th President. This eventually results in a Civil War occurring over the Compromise of 1850 and a different version of the Confederacy winning its independence in 1853.
 In the alternate history novel The Two Georges by Harry Turtledove and Richard Dreyfuss, Andrew Jackson was the Governor-General of the North American Union in 1834. He oversaw the end of slavery in the NAU, as recommended by Westminster.
 In the alternate history/time travel e-book Hail! Hail! by Harry Turtledove in which the Marx Brothers are sent back in time from 1934 to 1826 and interference with the Fredonian Rebellion. Julius Marx realized that Andrew Jackson was scheduled to defeat incumbent president John Quincy Adams in less than two years. Marx also realized that Jackson would be sympathetic to the slave-holding Fredonia and would probably fight the Mexican government. However, Marx also realized that Jackson would certainly be unsympathetic to the Cherokee who had allied themselves with Fredonia 
 In the alternate history novel For Want of a Nail, Andrew Jackson at the age of 13 was part of a group of former rebels who after Thomas Jefferson's execution migrated from the colonies in the Wilderness Walk (1780–1782), led by General Nathanael Greene whose party also included James Madison, James Monroe, Alexander Hamilton and Benedict Arnold. He later became a commander of an army from Jefferson (an ex-Patriot state, formerly Mexican Texas), orchestrating the capture of Mexico City in 1817. By 1819, he has merged Jefferson and Mexico in the United States of Mexico, becoming its first President in 1821.
 In the parallel universe featured in Fringe, Andrew Jackson had never served as president and, consequently, the twenty-dollar bill did not feature his portrait but that of Martin Luther King Jr. The counterparts of the Fringe Division members had never heard of Jackson in 2010. It is unclear whether Jackson had never been born in this universe or whether his counterpart had merely had a less distinguished and historically significant life and career.
 In the alternative history novel 1824: The Arkansas War by Eric Flint, Andrew Jackson was one of the four candidates of the 1824 United States presidential election. However, the election is thrown into the House of Representatives between Henry Clay and Jackson. Clay forms a political alliance with William Crawford and John C. Calhoun while John Quincy Adams supports Jackson. Clay ends up winning the election. After he becomes president, he engineers a conflict against the independent Arkansas Confederacy (a nation of voluntarily transplanted southern Indian nations and free negroes) by secretly and illegally arming a freebooter expedition led by Robert Crittenden that was intended to (and did) fail miserably.

Henry M. "Scoop" Jackson
 Henry M. Jackson is the president in 1986 in the "main" US timeline from Edward William Bear's universe in the book The Probability Broach as part of the North American Confederacy Series by L. Neil Smith. In the book itself, he runs an ecofascist government and he is only referred to as "President Jackson"; his identity is confirmed in the later sequel The Gallatin Divergence.

Michael Jackson
 Michael Jackson was president in the short story, "SEAQ and Destroy" by Charles Stross.

Rev. Jesse Jackson
 Jesse Jackson was president in Greg Costikyan's 1994 story "The West is Red", in which the Soviet Union won the Cold War. Jackson tried to walk a tightrope, instituting moderate social democratic reforms and partial nationalisations without altogether dismantling capitalism. However, an attempted coup d'état in 1989 tipped the balance and in the aftermath of its failure the United States fully adopted Communism.

Stonewall Jackson (Thomas Jonathan Jackson)
 In Margaret F. Kaplan's short story "Stonewall From Canada to Louisiana", the War of 1812 ended with a crushing defeat for the United States,  Britain imposing humiliating terms and forcing the Americans to cede New Orleans and much of Louisiana, as well as half of Maine, to the British Crown. Thomas Jonathan Jackson, later to become nicknamed Stonewall Jackson, was born in 1824 in a bitter US, licking the wounds of that defeat and seeking revenge on the British - an issue which overshadowed differences among the Americans themselves over such issues as slavery. Tensions and border incidents increased until the outbreak of the War of 1857, with the United States facing a two-pronged British invasion - from Canada to the north and Louisiana to the south-west. Thomas Jonathan Jackson, in command of the greatly outnumbered United States Army of Maine, commanded in a series of brilliant battles - blocking the invading British, which won him the nickname "Stonewall", and then turning the tables, launching a counter-invasion, and occupying a large slice of Canadian territory. Transferred to the southern front, he did brilliantly there as well. Colonel Abraham Lincoln served under Jackson on both fronts, and they became good personal friends. The war ended with a major American victory,  the US regaining all territory lost in the previous war, as well as gaining some Canadian territory and wresting major economic concessions from the British. General Jackson was credited with a large share in this victory and became a national hero. When he decided to go into politics, his success was a foregone conclusion. In the 1860 presidential election, he was elected President by a landslide, with Abraham Lincoln as his running mate. As President, Jackson sought to use his high personal prestige to find "a humane and widely-acceptable solution to the problem of slavery". During the first three years of his term, President Jackson and Vice President Lincoln worked out what became known as "The Compromise of 1863", providing for a gradual emancipation of the slaves and compensation to their owners. The election of 1864 were widely regarded as a referendum on this compromise. With Jackson being re-elected by an overwhelming majority, the Compromise - embodied in the Thirteenth Amendment - was soon ratified in both North and South. President Jackson was universally regarded as one of the greatest of American Presidents, fully worthy of having his portrait on Mount Rushmore in company with George Washington, Thomas Jefferson and Theodore Roosevelt.

Thomas Jefferson
 In a parallel universe featured in the short story "He Walked Around the Horses" by H. Beam Piper, Thomas Jefferson was a major participant in the short-lived rebellion in the colonies of the British North America in the 1770s. He was the author of the American rebels' Declaration of Philadelphia in which the colonies were styled as the "United States of America." After the defeat of the rebels, Jefferson fled to Havana, Cuba and eventually died in the Principality of Liechtenstein several years prior to 1809. A seemingly insane individual who claimed to be a British diplomat named Benjamin Bathurst maintained that the American rebels were successful in their attempts to achieve independence, Jefferson had gone to serve as the President of the United States and had been succeeded by James Madison.
 In the alternate history novel For Want of a Nail: If Burgoyne Had Won at Saratoga by the business historian Robert Sobel, Thomas Jefferson was a leading figure in the North American Rebellion (1775–1778) and the principal author of the Declaration of Independence. In June 1775, he was named a delegate of the Second Continental Congress, where he joined the radical John Adams in seeking independence from Great Britain. The following year, Adams had Jefferson appointed to the committee which drafted the Declaration of Independence, along with himself and Benjamin Franklin. Jefferson wrote the first draft of the Declaration, which was edited by the other committee members, then presented to the Congress on June 28, 1776, where it underwent further revision before being ratified on July 2, 1776, and signed on July 4, 1776. In September 1776, Jefferson was elected to the Virginia House of Delegates, where he worked to revise Virginia's laws to bring them in line with his own republican beliefs. In June 1778, after Congress adopted the Carlisle Proposals and returned the colonies to British rule, Jefferson was arrested and brought to London to stand trial for treason. He and Adams were both convicted and executed by hanging in 1779. After Jefferson's death, the former rebels who migrated from the colonies in the Wilderness Walk (1780–1782), led by General Nathanael Greene whose party included James Madison, James Monroe, Alexander Hamilton, Benedict Arnold and the 13-year-old Andrew Jackson, named their settlement in New Spain "Jefferson" in his honor. Jefferson's radical republicanism subsequently gave birth to a worldwide revolutionary known as "Jeffersonism".
 In the alternate history novel The Probability Broach as part of the North American Confederacy Series by L. Neil Smith in which the United States became a Libertarian state after a successful Whiskey Rebellion and George Washington being overthrown and executed by firing squad for treason in 1794, Thomas Jefferson adopts a new calendar system in 1796. He originally proposed the calendar system to mark Albert Gallatin's ascension to the presidency. However, Gallatin protested that the real Revolution was in 1776, that the Federalist period should be regarded as an aberration, and that commemorating, even by implication, the overthrowing and execution of George Washington might set a hideous precedent. In addition to this, Gallatin assisted historians to still count Washington as the first president. In the calendar systems final form, the year 1776 became the new year zero Anno Liberatis (A.L.) (Latin for "year of liberation"). In 1800, he develops a new weight and measuring system ("metric" inches, pounds, etc.). In 1811, he was targeted for assassination, but survived and killed his attempted assassin, although he did get stabbed in the leg with a knife and is forced to walk with a limp and a cane for the rest of his life. Jefferson was also able to successfully lead an abolitionist movement that sets all slaves (including his own) free by 1820. In 1820, he was elected as the 4th President of the United States and would serve until his death on July 4, 1826, and was succeeded by James Monroe.
 In the short story "The War of '07" by Jayge Carr in the anthology Alternate Presidents edited by Mike Resnick, Thomas Jefferson lost the 1800 election to Aaron Burr, who became the 3rd President. President Burr kept promising to stand down after one more term but was ultimately elected to a total of nine terms from 1800 to 1832. He died on September 14, 1836, and was succeeded by his 34-year-old grandson and vice president Aaron Burr Alston. It is implied that the presidency will henceforth be a hereditary office, making the United States a de facto monarchy or family dictatorship, as Alston's vice president is Paul Aaron Burr.
 In Harry Turtledove's Southern Victory alternate history series, Thomas Jefferson served as the 3rd President from March 4, 1801, to March 4, 1809, as he did in real life. Following the War of Secession (1861–1862) in which the Confederate States of America achieved its independence with the support of the United Kingdom and France, his status as a Virginian (and more substantively, his insistence on a weak central government) tarnished his memory considerably in the United States. Northern Founding Fathers and his contemporaries such as John Adams, Benjamin Franklin, and Alexander Hamilton were viewed much more favourably. Nevertheless, Jefferson joined George Washington, Abraham Lincoln and Theodore Roosevelt as one of the most memorable US Presidents, though of the four only Roosevelt was viewed in an entirely positive light. In the latter half of the War of Secession, Jefferson's youngest grandson George W. Randolph had been the Confederate States Secretary of War, which also contributed to the fact that he was viewed unfavourably by later generations in the United States.
 In the alternate history series The Tales of Alvin Maker by Orson Scott Card, Thomas Jefferson is mentioned as serving as the first President of the United States, which only stretches from the New England states to Virginia and extends westward to Ohio.
 In Michael Ferguson's story "Jefferson in Dublin", Thomas Jefferson in 1787 convinced the naval hero John Paul Jones to reject the offer of Catherine the Great to take up service in the Russian Navy. Instead, Jones returned to the United States and Jefferson succeeded in getting for him a new command in the US Navy. The grateful Jones remained beholden to Jefferson. During the 1796 Presidential Election, Jones took a leave from the Navy and was deeply involved in the Jefferson campaign. Due partly to his involvement, Jefferson defeated John Adams and became the second President of the US. As President, Jefferson took a strong pro-French and anti-British position. While not officially declaring war on Great Britain, the strained relationship amounted to a de facto war between the two countries. Jefferson also sent Jones at the head of a naval squadron to France, on a combined military and diplomatic mission. It was Jones who convinced General Napoleon Bonaparte to abandon his plans for an expedition to Egypt and Palestine and concentrate all the available French military and naval forces on supporting a revolt in Ireland. Due partly to innovative tactical and strategic advice which Jones offered to the French naval commanders, and partly to the Royal Navy having to divert considerable forces to North America, the French Expeditionary Force successfully effected a landing in Ireland. The French soldiers were greeted as liberators by the rebellious Irish, and within four months Napoleon reached Dublin and proclaimed the Hibernian Republic, headed by Wolfe Tone. A further campaign brought Napoleon to Belfast and Derry, sweeping up the last remnants of British resistance in Ireland. The story ends – as its title suggests – with President Jefferson arriving in Dublin for a state visit and being received by a tumultuous crowd. The postscript notes that Britain, demoralized by the loss of Ireland, signed a peace highly favorable to France and the US; that Jefferson served two terms and John Paul Jones was elected as the Third President of the United States in 1804; that Napoleon became the First Consul of the French Republic and retained that title to the end of his life; and that the Franco-American Alliance dominated the world during the 19th century, increasingly marginalizing the British Empire.

Andrew Johnson
 In the alternate history novel The Guns of the South by Harry Turtledove, Andrew Johnson was the vice presidential candidate of the breakaway Radical Republicans in the 1864 election, running with John C. Frémont. The ticket only wins three electoral votes from Kansas and the election was won by the Democratic candidate Horatio Seymour, who became the 17th President.
 In Turtledove's short story "Must and Shall", U.S. President Abraham Lincoln was killed by a Confederate army sharpshooter at the Battle of Fort Stevens on July 12, 1864, while observing General Jubal Early's attack. He was succeeded by Hannibal Hamlin, who became the 17th President. Andrew Johnson, whom Lincoln had chosen to replace Hamlin as his vice president on the ticket in that years upcoming election, was sidelined. On July 21, 1864, he could do nothing but glare up at the podium from the audience as Hamlin was inaugurated.
 In the alternate history novel The Impeachment of Abraham Lincoln by Stephen L. Carter, Vice President Andrew Johnson was assassinated by the German-born Confederate sympathiser George Atzerodt on April 14, 1865, whereas President Abraham Lincoln survived his co-conspirator John Wilkes Booth's attempt on his life in Ford's Theatre on the same night. During Lincoln's second term, the Radical Republicans, led by Senator Thaddeus Stevens, came to see his failure to punish the South and to protect its freed slaves as akin to treason. Furthermore, the Democrats and the former Confederates regarded Lincoln as a tyrant who imposed his will in violation of the United States Constitution. These disparate groups formed a coalition against Lincoln and accused him of wartime crimes for having suspended habeas corpus, taking millions from the Treasury without Congressional approval, declaring martial law and conspiring to overthrow Congress. Consequently, the House of Representatives voted to impeach him in the spring of 1867 and he faced trial in the Senate, where his attorney was a 21-year-old African American woman named Abigail Canner.

Lyndon B. Johnson
 In the short story "Fellow Americans" by Eileen Gunn contained in the anthology Alternate Presidents edited by Mike Resnick, Lyndon Johnson lost the 1964 election to Barry Goldwater, who used negative advertisement extensively by bringing to light questionable incidents from Johnson's past. He became the 37th President and went on to be re-elected in 1968. President Goldwater ordered that nuclear weapons be deployed against North Vietnam during the Vietnam War.
 In the short story "Dispatches From the Revolution" by Pat Cadigan, also contained in the anthology Alternate Presidents edited by Mike Resnick, Lyndon Johnson persevered and decided to run for a second full term in 1968. This caused widespread protests in the United States, eventually leading to a bomb being planted at the Democratic National Convention in Chicago, Illinois in August 1968. The explosion killed Johnson, Vice President Hubert Humphrey, Senator George McGovern of South Dakota and Senator Eugene McCarthy of Minnesota. While the official history stated that Senator Robert F. Kennedy of New York was likewise killed in the explosion, he was actually killed by a Chicago policeman. The chaos at the Convention led to a revolution. Governor Ronald Reagan of California was elected president in 1968 and turned the US into an autocratic state. He used nuclear weapons to end the Vietnam War, leading to the vast majority of the Vietnamese people being wiped out.
 In ARC Riders by David Drake and Janet Morris, Lyndon Johnson was still alive in 1991 and still President, at least nominally. He was used as a figurehead by a ruthless cabal which, instigated by a fanatical American nationalist time traveler from the future, overthrew the constitutional government in 1968 and seized power with the intention of winning the Vietnam War at all costs. By 1991, the whole of North Vietnam was occupied by American troops but the war continued unabated in central China, and the US was on the verge of collapse and a nuclear civil war. President Johnson, kept alive by constant medical attention, has no real power and little knowledge of the acts perpetrated by generals and secret policemen in his name.
 In the alternate history novel Voyage by Stephen Baxter, John F. Kennedy was the victim of an assassination attempt in Dallas, Texas on November 22, 1963. While Kennedy survived, his wife Jacqueline Kennedy was killed and he was left crippled and incapacitated. His condition forced him to resign and Lyndon B. Johnson became the 36th President.
 In the short story "Tom Joad" by Kim Newman and Eugene Byrne contained in the anthology Back in the USSA in which the United States became a socialist state called the United Socialist States of America (USSA) as the result of a revolution in 1917, the Federal Bureau of Ideology agents Eliot Ness and Melvin Purvis met a bedraggled homeless man named L.B. Johnson in the compartment of a train travelling to Nevada in 1937. He told the two incognito agents, who were attempting to catch the legendary underground labor activist Tom Joad, that he was born and raised in Texas but was dispossessed by the Mexican Occupation some years earlier. Johnson's travelling companions were a teenage girl named "Boxcar" Bertha Thompson and a mute and seemingly insane tramp who wore a tiny bowler hat, "too big baggy pants" and "a too small suit", carried a little walking stick and possessed a "sharp toothbrush moustache and wide, scary eyes" which made him look like Adolf Hitler.
 In the alternate history novel The Mirage by Matt Ruff, Lyndon Johnson was the evangelical dictator of the Christian States of America, a Third World country which consisted of 17 states in the East Coast of North America, at some point during the 20th Century.
 In Ward Samuels' short story "Conclusive Evidence", Lee Harvey Oswald survives Jack Ruby's attempt to kill him on November 24, 1963. A few hours later he gives interrogators a full confession, directly implicating Vice President Lyndon Johnson in ordering the assassination of President Kennedy. Meanwhile, Johnson had been inaugurated as the new President two days earlier. Upon Johnson's return to the White House, FBI Director J. Edgar Hoover is waiting with Oswald's confession. Johnson asks Hoover to leave him alone for a few minutes, takes a gun from a drawer in the Oval Office and kills himself - his Presidency having lasted only two days.     
 In the alternate history novel Surrounded by Enemies: What if Kennedy Survived Dallas? by Bryce Zabel, John F. Kennedy forced Lyndon Johnson to resign as vice president in January 1966 using evidence which indicated that Johnson had been involved in the failed attempt on his life on November 22, 1963, as leverage. In exchange for the information not being made public until ten years after his death, Johnson agreed to accept a plea bargain for multiple counts of bribery and financial malfeasance during his tenure in the Senate. Following Kennedy's impeachment, trial and removal from office for multiple incidents of extramarital affairs both before and during his term in office, Speaker John William McCormack became the 36th President on February 24, 1966. Johnson spent the remainder of his life in a federal prison and died on January 22, 1973, at the age of 64. He was very popular with his fellow inmates as he often assisted them with their appeals.
 In Underground Airlines by Ben H. Winters, the assassination of President-elect Abraham Lincoln led to the adoption of a modified version of the Crittenden Compromise, with slavery being preserved into the twenty-first century in the 'Hard Four' states: Alabama, Louisiana, Mississippi and Carolina. One consequence of this is the 'Texas War', an inconclusive fifteen-year-long war of secession starting during the presidency of native Texan Lyndon B. Johnson, with the state's opposition to slavery resulting from demographic changes (i.e. growing free Black and Hispanic populations).

The Jonas Brothers
 In the Avenue 5 episode "Let's Play with Matches", the crew and passengers of the interstellar cruise ship decide to replace Captain Ryan Clark with a new elected leader. However, after Clark finds himself being elected, and with eighty-seven per cent of the vote, astronaut Spike Martin comments that it was more than the "Jonas brothers won for their second term".

References

Lists of fictional presidents of the United States